The Kamkars is a Kurdish musical family group of seven brothers and a sister, all from the city of Sanandaj, the capital of the Kurdistan province of Iran.

The group has performed numerous concerts around the world, including their performance at the 2003 Nobel Peace Prize ceremony honoring Shirin Ebadi.

Group Members

Hooshang Kamkar - (director and composer of the group)
Bijan Kamkar - (lead singer and Tar, Rubab, Tombak, Dohol and Daf player)
Pashang Kamkar - (Santoor player)
Ghashang Kamkar - (Setar player)
Arjang Kamkar - (Tonbak player)
Arsalan Kamkar - (Barbat, Oud and Violin player)
Ardeshir Kamkar - (Kamancheh and Ghaychak player)
Ardavan Kamkar - (Santoor player)
Najmeh Tajaddod - (vocalist)
Maryam Ebrahimpour - (vocalist)
Saba Kamkar - (vocalist)
Hana Kamkar - (Daf)
Neyriz Kamkar - (Tar player)
Omid Lotfi - (Setar player)

Discography

Albums
 Zardie Khazan
 Baharan e Abidar
 In Memory of Hafez
 Shabahengam
 Baraneh
 Darya
 In Memory of Saba
 Afsaneh Sarzamine Pedari
 Living Fire (January 16, 1996) - 
 Nightingale with a Broken Wing (March 11, 1997) - 
 Chant of Drums (August 10, 1999) - 
 Kani Sepi (August 17, 1999) - 
 Music From Kurdistan (August 24, 1999) - 
 Gol Nishan (?)
 Biabane Bikaran
 Khorshid e Mastan

Compilations
 Persheng / Singer: Abbas Kamandi
 Ouraman / Singer: Abbas Kamandi
 Nashakiba / Singer: Homayoun Shajarian
 Emshow / Singer: Adnan Karim
 Dar Golestane / Singer: Shahram Nazeri

See also
Kamkar
Kurdish music
Music of Iran
Mastan Ensemble
 List of Iranian musicians
 Kurdistan Philharmonic Orchestra
Shahrokh Hedayati

Notes

External links
 Kamkar ensemble Official Website
 Kamkars in Kereshmeh website
 The Kamkars, Guardian Unlimited
 Şilêre: A song by Kamkars
 Sample 1
 Sample 2
 A very good song by this family

Persian classical music groups
Kurdish musical groups
Iranian Kurdish people
Barbad award winners